Fazel Atrachali (born 29 March 1992) is an Iranian kabaddi player who currently captains Puneri Paltan in the VIVO Pro Kabaddi League and the Iran National kabaddi team.

Atrachali is one of the most successful foreign players in the history of the Pro Kabaddi League and is currently the only foreign player to rank among the top 10 tackle points scorer in league history. In the 4th edition of the VIVO Pro Kabaddi league, he won the award of the Best Defender of the Season award. He is the highest-paid foreign player in the Pro Kabbadi League. He has 424 tackle points in Pro Kabaddi League. He is the top tackle point scorer and the most successful captain in PKL history.He and Manjit chillar are the only defender in PKL,who holds the record for being two times defender of the season in the league.

Early life
Atrachali started playing kabaddi from the young age of 11 in his hometown Gorgan in Iran. He has represented his country in the 2010 and 2014 Asian games, and even captained the national team in the 2014 games. Before entering into Pro Kabaddi League, he used to work as a blacksmith in his hometown as a side profession. He played the Asian Indoor Games in 2013. When not training hard on the mats or busy at work in the office, Atrachali enjoys wrestling in his free time.

Kabaddi career

Pro Kabaddi

Season 2

Atrachali made his VIVO Pro Kabaddi debut against Dabang Delhi in U Mumba's 29-25 win in Hyderabad, where he scored two tackle points. In his second outing, he scored a season-high of seven points against Puneri Paltan in his team’s 39-34 victory. Atrachali featured in five matches in Season 2, scoring 12 points.

Season 3
Atrachali was a much more prominent figure in U Mumba's roster in Season 3 and featured 11 times, scoring 32 tackle points and one raid point. He had a tackle success rate of 50% and was U Mumba's second-highest scoring defender of the campaign.

Season 4
Atrachali moved to the Patna Pirates for Season 4 and blossomed into one of the league’s best defenders. He finished the season as the leading tackle point scorer with 52 in 16 matches, which included four High 5s and seven Super Tackles. He won the VIVO Pro Kabaddi title with the Patna Pirates and was also awarded the Best Defender Award.

Season 5
The left corner joined new franchise Gujarat Fortunegiants for Season 5 and enjoyed another stellar individual campaign. He scored 57 tackle points, with five High 5s and three Super Tackles at a tackle strike rate of 57.57 in 24 matches. He led the Fortunegiants to the final where they were beaten by Patna Pirates.

Season 6
U Mumba re-signed Atrachali from the Season 6 auction and named him captain. Atrachali featured in all of U Mumba’s 23 matches and finished with 83 tackle points with six High 5s and three Super Tackles. He finished third in the race for Best Defender behind Nitesh Kumar and Parvesh Bhainswal.

Season 7
U Mumba retained Atrachali for PKL 7. He led the team to the semifinal where they eventually lost to Bengal Warriors. Atrachali enjoyed a decent season, finishing the league as the Best Defender with 82 tackle points. His best performance came against Haryana Steelers, where he scored 8 tackle points.

International
Atrachali was part of Iran's World Cup team that lost in the final to India and was also a member of the Asian Games Gold Medal Winning team, of which he was the captain.

Records and achievements

 VIVO Pro Kabaddi Best Defender (2016) - Season 4 (2019) - Season 7
 VIVO Pro Kabaddi Champion (2015) -  Season 2 (2016) - Season 4
 Asian games silver medalist (2010,2014)
 Asian Games Gold medalist (2018)

References 

Living people
Iranian kabaddi players
1992 births
Asian Games medalists in kabaddi
Kabaddi players at the 2010 Asian Games
Kabaddi players at the 2014 Asian Games
Kabaddi players at the 2018 Asian Games
Pro Kabaddi League players
Asian Games gold medalists for Iran
Asian Games silver medalists for Iran
Medalists at the 2010 Asian Games
Medalists at the 2014 Asian Games
Medalists at the 2018 Asian Games
21st-century Iranian people